A marabout is a Muslim religious leader and teacher who historically had the function of a chaplain serving as a part of an Islamic army, notably in North Africa and the Sahara, in West Africa, and (historically) in the Maghreb. The marabout is often a scholar of the Qur'an, or religious teacher. Others may be wandering holy men who survive on alms, Sufi Murshids ("Guides"), or leaders of religious communities.

The term "marabout" is also used for the mausolea of such religious leaders (cf. maqam, mazar, in Palestine also wali/weli).

West Africa

Muslim religious teachers

Muslim tariqah (Sufi religious brotherhoods) are one of the main organizing forms of West African Islam, and with the spread of Sufi ideas into the area, the marabout's role combined with local practices throughout Senegambia, the Niger River Valley, and the Futa Jallon. Here, Sufi believers follow a marabout, elsewhere known as a murshid "Guide". Marabout was also adopted by French colonial officials, and applied to most any imam, Muslim teacher, or secular leader who appealed to Islamic tradition.

Today marabouts can be traveling holy men who survive on alms, religious teachers who take in young talibes at Qur'anic schools, or distinguished religious leaders and scholars, both in and out of the Sufi brotherhoods which dominate spiritual life in Senegambia.

In the Muslim brotherhoods of Senegal, marabouts are organized in elaborate hierarchies; the highest marabout of the Mourides, for example, has been elevated to the status of a Caliph or ruler of the faithful (Amir al-Mu'minin). Older, North African based traditions such as the Tijaniyyah and the Qadiriyyah base their structures on respect for teachers and religious leaders who, south of the Sahara, often are called marabouts. Those who devote themselves to prayer or study, either based in communities, religious centers, or wandering in the larger society, are named marabouts. In Senegal and Mali, these Marabouts rely on donations to live. Often there is a traditional bond to support a specific marabout that has accumulated over generations within a family. Marabouts normally dress in traditional West African robes and live a simple, ascetic life.

Syncretic spiritualists
The spread in sub-Saharan Africa of the marabout's role from the eighth through thirteenth centuries created in some places a mixture of roles with pre-Islamic priests and divines. Thus many fortune tellers and self-styled spiritual guides take the name "marabout" (something rejected by more orthodox Muslims and Sufi brotherhoods alike). The recent diaspora of West Africans (to Paris in particular) has brought this tradition to Europe and North America, where some marabouts advertise their services as fortune tellers. An eshu of Quimbanda, Marabô, is believed to have carried this esoteric and shamanic role into Brazil. Contemporary marabouts in Senegal advertise on television and have hot lines.

Liliane Kuczynski. Les marabouts africains à Paris. CNRS Editions, Paris (2003) 
 Magopinaciophilie: An article discussing Europeans who collect calling card like advertisements by "marabouts".
 L'officiel du Marabout: Parisian advertisement collection.
 Magopinaciophiles: A collection of French flyers.

Political influence

Pre-French colonization
Marabouts have been prominent members of Wolof society since the arrival of Sufi brotherhoods from the Maghreb in the 15th century. Their advanced knowledge of the Quran and esteemed reputation have often allowed them to act as traders, priests, judges, or magicians in conjunction with their roles of community religious leaders. Additionally, because of their ability to read and write, village chiefs would frequently appoint marabouts as secretaries or advisers as a means to communicate with neighboring rulers.

The marabouts' expanding influence in politics paired with their unique allegiance of the Muslim community eventually posed a real threat to the chiefs who had appointed them. In 1683, rising tensions between chiefs and the Muslim population led to a Muslim revolt in the Wolof kingdom of Cayor, which concluded with the installation of a marabout as Damel.. In the years following the revolt, relations between marabouts and Wolof chiefs remained relatively calm until a period of militant Islam in the Wolof states in the middle of the 19th century. Militant marabouts primarily of Tukulor(l origin, called "warrior marabouts," completely rejected the authority of local chiefs and sought to install a theocratic Muslim state. As the authority of chiefs and royal armies were undermined by propaganda and military force used by the warrior marabouts, Muslim resistors turned to local marabouts for guidance and protection from their oppressors. After three decades of war and conflict, the warrior marabouts were gradually ousted from the Wolof states as French colonists began to take a tighter hold on the region. As confidence in the leadership abilities of chiefs and rulers declined as a result of the conflict, marabouts emerged as the most trusted and revered source of leadership in Wolof communities.

Post-French colonization
French colonizers had difficulties adjusting to ruling over Muslim societies. Particularly in West Africa, constructing institutions of colonial rule that didn't favor certain constituencies while neglecting others proved to be a tricky task. The French opted for forms of indirect rule through the local aristocracy in an effort to maintain order and keep administrative costs down, but found that many subjects detested these colonial chiefs and rulers and tended to gravitate towards their local marabouts. Marabouts were admired for their transparency and righteousness as they were known to renounce political powers, while ensuring economic, social, and religious stability within their communities. Since the judgment of marabouts is so influential, the success or failure of a politician would be almost entirely contingent on the support of more prominent marabouts. Because of this, politicians would try to appease marabouts by agreeing to promote their Sufi brotherhood's best interests in turn for their endorsement, with some politicians believing that winning an election would be impossible without the support of a marabout. This political dynamic, based on patronage and exchanges, would lead to a somewhat of an alliance between marabouts and the French colonizers. Along with endorsing certain politicians in exchange for favors, French colonial administrators sought out marabouts and heads of Sufi brotherhoods to act as intermediaries between colonial administrators and West African Muslims to ensure appropriate allocation of power and resources to avoid any potential conflict.

Post-independence
After Senegal gained its independence from France in 1960, marabouts and leaders of Sufi Brotherhoods (also marabouts), or the Khalife-Général, have continued to play influential roles in Senegalese politics. Some have questioned the utility of having clientelist relationships between marabouts and government officials in a modern democracy. The new "grandson" generation of marabouts has cultivated a more independent and secular political outlook and have proven that they are willing to question the authority of their predecessors. In Senegal's 1988 presidential election, Khalife-Général Abdou Lahatte Mbakke supported Abdou Diouf for reelection. Both as public endorsement and as a reward for installing new roads and street lamps in Touba while in office, the Khalife-Général declared a ndiggël (a binding command issued by the Khalife-Général to all members of the Mouride Brotherhood) that proclaimed that all men must vote for Diouf. Although multiple Khalife-Général have issued 'ndiggël politique' in support of a presidential candidate in previous elections, several marabouts of the "grandson" generation openly rejected the command by voting for the opposition instead. These marabouts believed that the ndiggël violated their secular political rights, which was a sentiment shared among many other Mourides in Touba.

In 1997, a rural council of Touba Mosquée in Senegal issued a set of new taxes meant to fund an ambitions development project in the holy city. City merchants promptly voiced their displeasure of the new taxes and threatened to kick the rural council, whose members were all appointed by the Mouride Khalife-Général, out of the city. Although tax revolts are not uncommon elsewhere, this incident was particularly noteworthy as the merchants' blatant refusal exhibited a departure from typical state-society relations in Senegal. Declining economic performance in Senegal may lead to more taxes in the future, which means political actors may have to adjust or fundamentally alter their clientelist relationships with marabouts and Khalife-Général.

The Maghreb

The term Marabout appears during the Muslim conquest of the Maghreb. It is derived from the Arabic murābiṭ "one who is garrisoned": religious students and military volunteers who manned ribats at the time of the conquest. Today marabout means "saint" in the Berber languages, and refers to Sufi Muslim teachers who head a lodge or school called a zāwiya, associated with a specific school or tradition, called a  "way, path".

The pronunciation of that word varies by language. For example, it is pronounced amrabadh in the Berber Riffian language. Marabouts are known as sidi in Maghrebi Arabic. Many cities in Morocco got their names from local marabouts, and the name of those cities usually begins with "Sidi" followed by the name of the local marabout. Modern Standard Arabic for "saint" is "walī".

A marabout may also refer to a tomb ( qubba "dome") of a venerated saint, and such places have become holy centers and places of pious reflection.

Some Zāwiyas linked with specific marabouts
Note that these are not places of formal pilgrimage (limited in Islam to religious pilgrimages of the Hajj and Jerusalem), but are rather places of reflection and inspiration for the pious.

Morocco
In Morocco:
 Sidi Ali el Goumi
 Sidi Rhaj Amar (Arabda)
 Sidi Allal el Behraoui
 Sidi Abdelah ben Hassoun
 Sidi Moulay Idriss
 Sidi fath
 Sidi el Arbi ben sayyeh
 Sidi Ahmed Tijani
 Sidi Moulay Ali 
 Sidi Hajj Hamza Qadiri Boutchichi
 Sidi Sheikh Abdul Qadir Jilani
 Sidi Abdel Kader el Alami
 Sidi Moulay Ibrahim
 Sidi Mohammed Ben Aissa
 Sidi Ahmed Ben Idris Al-Fassi (Idrissiya and Sanoussiya)
 Ahmad u Musa
 Sidi Abu Lhcen Shadili
 Sidi Moulay Abdeslam ibn Mchich Alami (Jbala)
 Sidi Muhammad al-Arabi al-Darqawi
 Sidi Muhammad ibn Sulayman al-Jazuli al-Simlali
 Sidi Abu Abdallah Mohammed Amghar
 Sidi Abu Abdallah al-Qaim bi Amrillah
 Sidi Muhammad ben Issa al-Barnusi al-Fasi Zarruq
 Sidi Moulay Outman (Khaldy-yeen, Beni Arouse), Morocco
 Sidi Mbarek (Khaldy-yeen, Beni Arouse), Morocco
 Sidi Heddi (Khaldy-yeen, Beni Arouse), Morocco
 (alternatively) Zawiyas:
 Zaouïa Naciria
 Zaouïa Cherqaouia
 Zaouia Aïssaouia
 Zaouia Tidjaniya
 Zaouia Idrissiya
 Zaouia Sanoussiya
 Zaouia Al Qadiriya
 Zaouia Al Alamiya
 Zaouia Jazouliya semlaliya
 Zaouia Hamdouchia
 Zaouia Sidi Outman (Khaldyeen, Beni Arouse), Morocco

Algeria
In Algeria:
 sidi Mohand Rezag Ou Assous from akfadou bejaia
 Sidi Ahmed Tidjani of 'Ainou Mahdi, around Laguouate founder of Tidjaniya
 Sidi Ahmed ou Saïd du hameau Mestiga, village of Adeni in Kabylia (between Tizi Ouzou and L'Arbaâ Nath Irathen)
 Sidi M'hamed Bou Qobrine Founder of the Rahmaniya (Algiers and Bounouh)
 Sidi Abder Rahman El Thaelebi, founder of the Thaalibiya (Algiers)
 Sidi M'hend oumalek (Tifrit nait oumalek)
 Sidi Moh'Ali oulhadj (Tifrit n'Aït el Hadj)
 Sidi Harrat Benaissa El Idrissi (Zemmora, Relizane)
 Sidi Abd-Allah ben Mançour
 Sidi Abdelkader djilali (tizi-ouzou)
 Sidi Abid Echerrif (Guentis)
 Sidi Abou AbdAllah Ech Choudi El Halloui
 Sidi A'hmed el Mejdoub
 Sidi Bel Abbes (namesake of Sidi Bel Abbès)
 Sidi Ben-Ali (Aïn el Hout - Tlemcen)
 Sidi Ben-Ali (Nédromah)
 Sidi Ben-Azzouz (Borj Ben Azzouz)
 Sidi Bicinti el basco
 Sidi Bou Adjami
 Sidi Boudarga
 Sidi Boudjemaa
 Sidi Brahim
 Sidi Daoudi
 Sioud anta' El-Eubbad es-Saffi
 Sidi En-Naceur
 Sidi Et Toumi
 Sidi Hamadouche
 Sî ibn 'Alî Sharîf (Akbou)
 Sidi Mohammed Ben Omar El Houari
 Sidi Mohammed bou Semah'a,
 Sidi Moh'amed Ou'l Il'afian.
 Sidi Moulebhar
 Sidi Qadir
 Sidi Bel-Ezrag
 Sidi Serhane
 Sidi ghiles (tipaza)
 Sidi Soumeymane Ben Abdallah
 Zaouia de Sidi Benamar (Fillaoussenne)
 Sidi-Wahhab
 Sidi Yahia el Aidly (Akbou)
 Sidi Yakkout
 Oulad bel Kacem

Tunisia
In Tunisia:
 Zaouïa de Sidi Ben Azzouz. Nefta
 Zaouïa de Sidi Bouteffaha. Béja
 Zaouïa de Sidi Salah Zlaoui. Béja
 Zaouïa de Sidi Abdelkader. Béja
 Zaouïa de Sidi Bou Arba. Béja
 Zaouïa de Sidi Taieb. Béja
 Zaouïa de Sidi Baba Ali Smadhi. Béja
 Zaouïa de Sidi Ali El Mekki
 Zaouïa de Sidi El Mazri. Monastir
 Zaouïa de Sidi Bou Jaafar. Sousse
 Zaouïa de Sidi Abdel Hamid. Sousse

See also
 Traditional Berber religion

References

  Christian Coulon, Pouvoir maraboutique et pouvoir politique au Sénégal, Paris, Université de Paris, 1976, 2 vol. 594 p. (Thèse d’Etat, remaniée et publiée en 1981 sous le titre Le marabout et le prince. Islam et pouvoir au Sénégal, Paris, Pedone, XII-317 p.)
  Bassirou Diop, Le rôle joué par les marabouts toucouleurs dans l’islamisation du Sénégal, Dakar, Université de Dakar, 1983 (Mémoire de Maîtrise)
 Christopher Harrison. France and Islam in West Africa, 1860-1960, Cambridge University Press (1988) 
 E. Westermarck, Ritual and Belief in Morocco. London 1926.
 Leonardo Alfonso Villalón. Islamic Society and State Power in Senegal: Disciples and Citizens in Fatick, Cambridge University Press, (1995) 

Maghreb
Islam in Africa
Religious leadership roles
History of North Africa
Islamic mysticism
Religion in Africa
French West Africa
West Africa
Arabic words and phrases
Religious syncretism
Islamic honorifics